False Alarm is the fourth studio album by Northern Irish indie rock band Two Door Cinema Club, released on 21 June 2019 by Prolifica Inc. and PIAS Recordings. The album was preceded by four singles, "Talk", "Satellite", "Dirty Air" and "Once".

Writing and development
After ending their tour in support for their previous album, Gameshow (2016), the band started writing new ideas while on the road. In an interview with Digital Spy in June 2018, lead singer Alex Trimble revealed that the band was working on an album and that there would be "interesting" collaborations with other artists.

Release and promotion
On 11 February 2019, Two Door Cinema Club released a teaser video on their social media accounts to tease a new album with the caption "Album 4 – who's ready?"

The lead single, "Talk", was released on 18 March 2019.

The band's second single, "Satellite", was released on 24 April 2019. On the same day, the band revealed details about the new album, and hosted a live stream on their Facebook page. A copy of the album artwork was also launched into space minutes before the live stream began.

The album was announced to have been pushed back a week to 21 June 2019 due to a "vinyl factory issue" on 20 May 2019.

The third single, "Dirty Air", was released on 21 May 2019, followed by "Once" on 19 June 2019.

Critical reception

False Alarm received generally positive reviews from critics. At Metacritic, which assigns a normalised rating out of 100 to reviews from mainstream publications, the album received an average score of 76, based on 8 reviews.

In a four out of five star review, Matt Collar of AllMusic called the album "a colorful, good-time album by a band that's maturing, and having fun at the same time." Nick Lowe of Clash gave the record a highly positive review, saying, "On this record, the three piece are as creative and alluring than ever before, and it solidifies the band's place at the top of their game. Through wide-eyed vulnerability and reflective song writing, False Alarm is a game-changing record for the future of indie-rock."

Track listing

Personnel
Credits adapted from the liner notes of False Alarm.

Two Door Cinema Club
 Kevin Baird – bass guitar, keyboards
 Sam Halliday – guitar
 Alex Trimble – vocals, guitars, percussion, keyboards

Additional personnel

 Ben Thompson – drums
 Jacknife Lee – keyboards, guitar, programming, percussion, production ; mixing 
 Matt Bishop – engineering
 John Davis – mastering
 Will Parton – recording assistance
 Dan Grech-Marguerat – mixing 
 Joel Davies – mixing assistance 
 Charles Haydon Hicks – mixing assistance 
 Laura Hayden – backing vocals 
 Mokoomba – backing vocals 
 Aleksandra Kingo – photography, artwork
 Annelise Keestra – graphic design

Charts

References

2019 albums
Albums produced by Jacknife Lee
PIAS Recordings albums
Two Door Cinema Club albums